Anna Julia Komorowska (née Dziadzia, born 11 May 1953) is a Polish classical philologist and former First Lady of Poland, as the wife of 5th President of Poland, Bronisław Komorowski.

Early life and education
She was born to Jan Dziadzia and Józefa Deptuła (born as Hana Rojer). Both of her parents worked for the communist Ministry of Public Security in post-war Poland. Her maternal grandparents Wolf and Estera Rojer were killed in the Holocaust. The family later changed their name to "Dembowski".

Career
Komorowska was a Latin teacher at a high school. She met Bronisław Komorowski in 1970, when she was a member of the Czarna Jedynka. They married in 1977. They have five children: Zofia (born 1979), Tadeusz (born 1981), Maria (born 1983), Piotr (born 1986) and Elżbieta (born 1989). After the introduction of martial law in Poland, her husband was interned. On 31 December 1981, she reached his internment camp as one of the first three women ever to do so. After the fall of communism in Poland, she worked for an insurance company for five years.

Honours

Foreign honours 
 : Grand Officer of the Order of Saint Charles (October 2012, Monaco)
 : Commander with the Great Cross Order of the Northern Star (4 May 2011)

References 

1953 births
Living people
First Ladies of Poland
Grand Officers of the Order of Saint-Charles
Polish people of Jewish descent
Recipients of the Order of the Cross of Terra Mariana, 1st Class
Latin-language education
Polish schoolteachers
Language teachers
University of Warsaw alumni